Valliyoorkkavu is an ancient Bhagavathy temple located near Mananthavady in the Wayanad district. The temple is for Goddess Durga as its presiding deity in three forms namely: Vana Durga,  Bhadrakali, and Jala Durga.

The idol of the temple is believed to be self-manifested and the annual festival falls in the month of March and will last for 14 days. It is a major event and thousands of people from all over the place takes part in this biggest event.

The temple has many numerous rituals held during the festival include the oppana varavu, a procession from Cheramkode Bhagavathy temple at Kallody near Mananthavady and Adiyaras, a procession with tender coconut for abhishekam (ablution) marks the arattu of Valliyooramma. The festival concluded when the oppana varavu returns to Cheramkode Bhagavathy temple after the rudhirakkolam, a symbolic fight between Goddess and the demon king, Darika, in which the Bhagavathy wins. 

The festival is very important for the tribal people of Wayanad. The traditional ritual of  Kalamezhuthu is performed during the nights of the festival. On the final day, the array of folk art forms are presented. The dances are performed by the local tribes with native percussion instruments, which is a major attraction. Also, the scenic beauty of the place with hillocks and the Kabani River is worth seeing.

Transportation
Valliyoorkkavu can be accessed from Mananthavady or Kalpetta. The Periya ghat road connects Mananthavady to Kannur and Thalassery.  The Thamarassery ghat road connects Calicut with Kalpetta. The Kuttiady ghat road connects Vatakara with Kalpetta and Mananthavady. The Palchuram mountain road connects Kannur and Iritty with Mananthavady. The road from Nilambur to Ooty also connects Wayanad through the village of Meppadi.

The nearest railway station is at Mysore 115 km.
The nearest airports are Kozhikode International Airport-120 km, Bengaluru International Airport-290 km and Kannur International Airport 58 km.

Image gallery

See also
 Kattikkulam
 Thirunelly
 Mananthavady

References

Mananthavady Area
Hindu temples in Wayanad district
Durga temples
Devi temples in Kerala
Bhagavathi temples in Kerala